Ionuț Georgian Tănase (born 9 January 1998) is a Romanian professional footballer who plays as a midfielder for CSC Dumbrăvița. In his career Tănase also played for UTA Arad, Gloria Lunca-Teuz Cermei, FC U Craiova and CS Mioveni.

International career
Tănase played for Romania U-17 in 4 matches.

Honours
FC U Craiova 1948
Liga III: 2019–20

References

External links
 

1998 births
Living people
Sportspeople from Pitești
Romanian footballers
Association football midfielders
Romania youth international footballers
Liga II players
FC UTA Arad players
FC U Craiova 1948 players
CS Mioveni players
CSC Dumbrăvița players